Calcuruppe Airport ,  is a lakeside airport  south of Llifén, a village in the Los Ríos Region of Chile.

The airport is on the eastern shore of Ranco Lake. There is high terrain north through east of the runway.

See also

Transport in Chile
List of airports in Chile

References

External links
OpenStreetMap - Calcuruppe
OurAirports - Calcuruppe
FallingRain - Calcuruppe Airport

Airports in Chile
Airports in Los Ríos Region